The CR Society International (or CRSI) is a nonprofit 501(c)(3) organization that was previously known as the CR Society or Calorie Restriction Society.

In 1994, Brian M. Delaney, Lisa Walford, and Roy Walford, along with several others, founded CR Society International . The group sponsors conferences and funds anti-aging research .

See also
 CRON-diet

Further reading
 Conniff, Richard (February 16, 2017), "The Hunger Gains: Extreme Calorie-Restriction Diet Shows Anti-Aging Results"
 Lauth, Kimberly (October 21, 2009), "Calorie restriction: fountain of youth or dangerous diet?"
 Should you severely restrict calories? CNN Interview with Brian M. Delaney
 Seligman, Katherine (September 2, 2007) San Francisco Chronicle, "Iron Will: Can a diet of a quarter fewer calories than a body needs lead Boomers to that ever elusive fountain of youth?"

References

External links
 Calorie Restriction Society International

Medical and health organizations based in North Carolina